MHD may refer to:

 MHD (rapper), a French rapper from the 19th arrondissement of Paris
 MHD (album), the rapper's 2016 debut album
 MHD, former name of the HDTV network for MTV, VH1, Palladia, and CMT now known as MTV Live
 Mashhad International Airport's IATA code
 Magnetohydrodynamics, the study of the magnetic properties and behaviour of electrically conducting fluids
 Magnetohydrodynamics (journal)
 Malteser International, an aid agency
 Menstrual Hygiene Day, a day to raise awareness about menstrual hygiene management issues
 Military history detachment, a unit of United States Army
 Mindesthaltbarkeitsdatum, the German term for shelf life, printed on imported German food or medical products 
 Doctor of Marine Histories (DMH, formerly Marine Histories Doctorate or MHD), such as issued by Sea Research Society's College of Marine Arts
 GNU libmicrohttpd, an embeddable HTTP server
 Airline code for CAAC Airlines
Městská hromadná doprava (Czech) or mestská hromadná doprava (Slovak), public transport systems in Czech and Slovak cities
Marblehead, a historic town located in Massachusetts